Hideous may refer to:

 Ugliness 
 Hideous (liqueur)
 Hideous!, a 1997 film directed by Charles Band